Rât may refer to one of the following rivers in Romania:

 Rât, tributary of the Canalul Morilor in Arad County
 Rât (Ier), tributary of the Ier in Bihor County
 Rât (Mureș), tributary of the Mureș in Alba County

See also
Rat River (disambiguation)